Vegas (stylized as Vega$) is an American crime drama television series starring Robert Urich that aired on ABC from September 20, 1978, to June 3, 1981, with the pilot episode airing April 25, 1978. Vegas was produced by Aaron Spelling and created by Michael Mann. The series (with the exception of special episodes filmed in Hawaii and San Francisco) was filmed in its entirety on location in Las Vegas, Nevada.

Urich stars as private detective Dan Tanna, who drives to his detective assignments around the streets of Las Vegas in a red 1957 Ford Thunderbird convertible. (The red T-Bird replaced a 1967 yellow Chevrolet Corvette that was used in the pilot episode, a car which ended up being 'destroyed' by fire.) Working for a wide variety of Las Vegas clients, the detective work included locating missing persons, helping solve various Las Vegas crimes, solving casino chip and money scams, and making Las Vegas a safer place for residents and tourists alike. Dan Tanna makes a point of not accepting divorce cases, or working as a bodyguard. Being in Las Vegas, Tanna sometimes gets hired to work for a variety of well known celebrity clients, who have issues regarding their personal safety, and need help solving personal issues, and threats against them.

Plot
Dan Tanna (Robert Urich) is a high-end Las Vegas private detective, whose many different clients include series regular Phillip 'Slick' Roth (Tony Curtis), the owner of several hotel casinos, including the Maxim Hotel Casino and the Desert Inn hotel and country club in Las Vegas. Tanna is often called by private citizens to help investigate unsolved criminal cases, locate missing family or business associates, or even work in rather absurd situations, such as the property case of a nun, played by Cassie Yates, who has a claim deed that says she owns the Las Vegas land on which the Desert Inn Hotel Casino stands. Tanna has the reputation of being a high-risk crime problem-solver; thus, he will not accept bodyguard assignments or handle divorce cases. Given that many of his detective cases are dangerous, he carries a powerful sidearm at all times.

Tanna lives on the Las Vegas Strip next to the Circus Circus hotel/casino, in the theatrical showroom props warehouse owned by the Desert Inn. The large props warehouse where he lives has been partially converted into his living quarters. The unique garage design of Tanna's home allows him to park his red Ford Thunderbird convertible in his living room. Tanna also uses gadgets considered high-tech for the very late 1970s, such as a radio car phone, and an answering machine that physically picks his phone off the hook and into the microphone of a tape recorder.

Two snow day events, pretty rare in Las Vegas, were worked into the plots of separate episodes.

Cast and characters

Main cast
 Robert Urich as Dan Tanna
 Bart Braverman as Bobby 'Binzer' Borso
 Phyllis Davis as Beatrice Travis
 Greg Morris as Lt. David Nelson
 Naomi Stevens as Sgt. Bella Archer
 Tony Curtis as Phillip (Slick) Roth
 Judy Landers as Angie Turner (Season 1 only)
 Will Sampson as Harlon Twoleaf (Season 1 and 2)

Characters
Dan Tanna (Urich) is a tough, but also very smart and sensitive, Las Vegas private detective. He tries to be thorough and professional with his work, carefully tracking down the pieces of evidence needed to solve a wide variety of criminal and civil cases. Various Vegas episodes document, through flashbacks, Tanna's dangerous combat experiences in the Vietnam War. Though Dan Tanna carries a handgun he flashes and even fires in self defense when necessary, he also tries to use his intelligence and his many Las Vegas connections to solve crimes and solve cases. Tanna tools around Las Vegas, and Nevada, in his beautiful 1957 red Ford Thunderbird. 

Beatrice Travis (Phyllis Davis), Tanna's Girl Friday, is a widowed single mother who moonlights in season 1 as a Las Vegas showgirl. As she takes on more responsibilities as Tanna's assistant, her showgirl role diminishes. Though Bea and Tanna make a dashing couple, their relationship is platonic, except for occasional friendly kisses. Beatrice pushes Tanna to try to stay busy, often saying to him on the phone, "earn some money, honey", and they appeared to be close personal friends throughout the 69 episodes of Vegas.

Phillip "Slick" Roth (Tony Curtis) is Tanna's primary client and lead generator. Roth is a self-made millionaire, a hands-on businessman, who owns and manages both the Desert Inn Resort and the Maxim Hotel Casino in Las Vegas. Though Roth is sarcastic and hard-bitten, Roth sincerely likes Dan Tanna, and often expresses how much he treasures Tanna's loyalty, and feels he has a father-son relationship with him. 'Slick' Roth made 17 episode appearances throughout the three-year prime-time run of Vegas. Roth relies on Tanna to help him in a wide variety of criminal and civil cases involving his businesses. Though Roth is now a wealthy man, he always remembers the stressful and tough times before he was wealthy, and he often exhibits an earthy and self-deprecating sense of humor in his dealings with Dan Tanna, the casino and hotel guests, his showroom employees and showgirls, and the many other employees on his hotel staffs. 

Dave Nelson (Greg Morris) is a lieutenant with the Las Vegas Metropolitan Police Department, and while he is a no-nonsense officer, he often backs up Tanna in criminal case investigations, and vice versa. While Lt. Nelson is never one to breach police protocol, he sometimes secretly assists Tanna in criminal cases on which his police force is prohibited from officially working. In the first season of Vegas, Nelson had a more adversarial relationship with Tanna, but their working friendship grows over the next two seasons.  In the pilot, Nelson's first name was George and was played by Raymond St. Jacques.

Bella Archer (Naomi Stevens) is a sergeant in the Las Vegas Metro police department who also assists both Tanna and Nelson in criminal-case research. Bella filed criminal cases in the police department, and while she was sarcastic, she was also adept at giving Dan Tanna inside criminal information whenever possible. Bella Archer appeared only in the first Vegas season.

Binzer (Bart Braverman) often assists with Tanna's detective leg work, and moonlights part time as a pool assistant at the Desert Inn. Early in the Vegas series, Binzer is revealed to be a former petty thief who fled to Las Vegas to escape his former partners in crime back east. His criminal background is described in one Vegas episode, in which Binzer's real name is revealed to be Robert (Bobby) Borso. Always the protective detective, Dan Tanna invariably seems to take Binzer under his wing, and wisely uses Binzer's knowledge of the streets, and his connections to the Las Vegas street scene. Bart Braverman appeared in the pilot episode as an unnamed character (possibly a pimp or the henchman of one) that Tanna shakes down for information concerning the disappearance of a young woman. During the shakedown, Tanna, possibly out of surprise that he extracted the information rather easily, tells him he is "not cut out for this kind of work".  If this was actually the foundation for the introduction of Binzer's character, it is never revealed.  

Angie (Judy Landers), is Tanna's secondary office assistant; Angie is a part-time working showgirl. Unlike the savvy and clever Beatrice, Angie is sweet, but also somewhat scatterbrained, and occasionally gets case work and names mixed up. Angie does not appear in Vegas after the first season, with Bea assuming virtually all office-related responsibilities.

Harlon Twoleaf (Will Sampson) is Tanna's close friend who served with him in the Vietnam War, and occasionally assists in some of his detective cases. Twoleaf, who disappeared after the conclusion of the first season, owns a small, working horse ranch, and he enjoys reminiscing with Tanna about their younger days. Twoleaf often is the "muscle" during Tanna's shakedowns.  A proud Native American, his imposing appearance is enough to scare suspects and informants into submission, with little violence actually taking place.

Guest stars

Chuck Connors episode was filmed at the historic Daydream Ranch.  Robert Reed and Maureen McCormick portrayed a father and daughter in a season-one episode, "The Pageant". The duo previously starred together in The Brady Bunch (1969–74), in which Reed portrayed family patriarch Mike, with McCormick as eldest daughter Marcia. In a later episode, Reed reappeared as Phillip Roth's brother. 

Robert Mandan and Robert Urich had worked together in the situation comedy Soap. Mandan played Chester Tate, Jessica Tate's husband and Urich as Jessica's lover, Peter the tennis pro, who was murdered by Chester Tate.

Heather Menzies was Robert Urich's real-life wife since 1975.

Episodes

Episode list

Crossovers
In the season-three premiere of Charlie's Angels titled "Angels in Vegas", Robert Urich does a cameo as his Vegas character Dan Tanna at the end of the episode. This episode aired the week before the Vegas series premiere.

Syndication
Vegas began airing in off-network syndication shortly after its cancelation in the early 1980s. It was also one of the first shows to premiere on FX when that channel began in 1994; FX ceased airing episodes around 2000. In July 2015, Vegas began airing on the Decades network. In November 2021, Vegas began airing on MeTV Plus. On August 30, 2022, Vegas began airing on Heroes & Icons as part of the Day Shift programming block.

Home media
CBS DVD (distributed by Paramount) has released all three seasons of Vegas on DVD in a Region 1 box set on May 2, 2017. In Region 4, Madman Entertainment has released the first season on DVD in Australia.

References

External links
 
 Review of 1st Season DVD set and production history of series

1978 American television series debuts
1981 American television series endings
1970s American crime drama television series
1970s American mystery television series
1980s American crime drama television series
1980s American mystery television series
American Broadcasting Company original programming
American detective television series
English-language television shows
Fictional portrayals of the Las Vegas Metropolitan Police Department
Television series by CBS Studios
Television series by Spelling Television
Television shows set in Las Vegas
Television shows shot in the Las Vegas Valley
Works by Michael Mann